The 1961 VMI Keydets football team  was an American football team that represented the Virginia Military Institute (VMI) as a member of the Southern Conference (SoCon) during the 1961 NCAA University Division football season. Led by ninth-year head coach John McKenna, the Keydets compiled an overall record of 6–4 with a mark of 4–2 in conference play, tying for third place in the SoCon.

Schedule

References

VMI
VMI Keydets football seasons
VMI Keydets football